Clent Castle is a sham ruin castellated folly in the grounds of Clent Grove (the site of Sunfield Children's Home) that is situated opposite the Fountain Inn on Adams Hill in Clent, Worcestershire, England. It was built in the late 18th century by Thomas Liell, and it has been designated by English Heritage as a Grade II listed building.

English Heritage describes the building thus:

See also
 Hagley Castle, a folly in Hagley Park which is visible from close to the summit of Clent Hill.

Notes

References

Castles in Worcestershire
Grade II listed buildings in Worcestershire
Grade II listed castles
Folly castles in England